John Ankwyll is normally considered to be the first English humanist schoolmaster.

References

Year of birth missing
Year of death missing
15th-century educators
English Renaissance humanists
15th-century English people
English male writers